Sumerian or Sumerians may refer to:
Sumer, an ancient civilization
Sumerian language
Sumerian art
Sumerian architecture
Sumerian literature
Cuneiform script, used in Sumerian writing
Sumerian Records, an American record label based in Washington, D.C. and Los Angeles

See also
Sumeria (disambiguation)
Sumer (disambiguation)
Sumarian (disambiguation)

Language and nationality disambiguation pages